"Not Afraid Anymore" is a song recorded by American singer and songwriter Halsey for the soundtrack of the 2017 film Fifty Shades Darker. It was written by Halsey, Jason Quenneville, Nasri Atweh, Adam Messinger and produced by Atweh and Messinger under The Messengers. The song was released on January 13, 2017, by Universal Music Group as the second single from the album.

Charts

Certifications

Release history

References

2017 singles
2017 songs
Halsey (singer) songs
Fifty Shades film music
Universal Music Group singles
Republic Records singles
Songs written by Nasri (musician)
Songs written by Adam Messinger
Song recordings produced by the Messengers (producers)
Songs written by DaHeala
Songs written by Halsey (singer)